is a private university in Fukuoka, Fukuoka, Japan, established in 1960 and contributes to wide variety of medical research within Japan. It is part of the Tsuzuki Educational Group.

External links
 Official website 

Educational institutions established in 1960
Private universities and colleges in Japan
Universities and colleges in Fukuoka Prefecture
1960 establishments in Japan